Rómulo Otero Vásquez (born 9 November 1992) is a Venezuelan footballer who plays as an attacking midfielder for Fortaleza.

Career
After a brief time in the B team of Caracas FC, he was promoted to the first team in 2010. He was loaned to Huachipato in 2015 who signed him the following year. In July 2016, he was loaned to Atlético Mineiro where he signed a contract in April 2017.

On 28 May 2018, Otero joined Saudi club Al-Wehda on loan from Atlético. On 29 November 2018, the club expressed the intention of signing Otero on a permanent basis, but the deal ultimately did not go through.

International career

International goals

|-
| 1. || 10 September 2013 || Estadio José Antonio Anzoátegui, Puerto La Cruz, Venezuela ||  || 3–1 || 3–2 || 2014 World Cup qualification
|-
| 2. || 5 March 2014 || Estadio Olímpico Metropolitano, San Pedro Sula, Honduras ||  || 1–1 || 2–1 || Friendly
|-
| 3. || 24 March 2016 || Estadio Nacional, Lima, Peru ||  || 1–0 || 2–2 || rowspan=4| 2018 World Cup qualification
|-
| 4. || 29 March 2016 || Estadio Agustín Tovar, Barinas, Venezuela ||  || 1–0 || 1–4
|-
| 5. || 10 November 2016 || Estadio Monumental de Maturín, Maturín, Venezuela ||  || 5–0 || 5–0
|-
| 6. || 23 March 2017 || Estadio Monumental de Maturín, Maturín, Venezuela ||  || 2–0 || 2–2
|}

Honours
Atlético Mineiro
Campeonato Mineiro: 2017

Individual
 Saudi Professional League Player of the Month: October 2018

References

External links

1992 births
Living people
Footballers from Caracas
Venezuelan footballers
Association football midfielders
Venezuelan Primera División players
Caracas FC players
Chilean Primera División players
C.D. Huachipato footballers
Campeonato Brasileiro Série A players
Clube Atlético Mineiro players
Sport Club Corinthians Paulista players
Fortaleza Esporte Clube players
Saudi Professional League players
Al-Wehda Club (Mecca) players
Liga MX players
Cruz Azul footballers
Copa América Centenario players
2021 Copa América players
Venezuela international footballers
Venezuelan expatriate footballers
Venezuelan expatriate sportspeople in Chile
Venezuelan expatriate sportspeople in Brazil
Venezuelan expatriate sportspeople in Saudi Arabia
Expatriate footballers in Chile
Expatriate footballers in Brazil
Expatriate footballers in Saudi Arabia